The Winter Haven Heights Historic Residential District (also known as Winter Haven Heights Historic District) is a U.S. historic district in Winter Haven, Florida. On June 15, 2000, it was added to the U.S. National Register of Historic Places.

Gallery

References

External links
 Polk County listings at National Register of Historic Places

National Register of Historic Places in Polk County, Florida
Winter Haven, Florida
Historic districts on the National Register of Historic Places in Florida